Carlferdinand Zech (14 December 1928 – 16 September 1999) was a German musicologist, composer and choir conductor.

Life 
Born in Potsdam, Zech attended the Franckesche Stiftungen in Halle an der Saale. Afterwards, he attended the secondary school in Schönebeck (Elbe) until the Abitur in 1948, where Hans Naumilkat was his teacher. During this time, he conducted the Volkschor and the school choir of Schönebeck. Zech also composed his first works for stage music. He completed his studies as Kapellmeister. He also passed the Staatsexamen in conducting and music theory.

From 1955 to 1959, Zech was an assistant at the Institute for Musicology of the Martin Luther University of Halle-Wittenberg. He then directed the Stadtsingechor zu Halle until 1968, which he rebuilt. He installed choir classes and affiliated the choir with Latina August Hermann Francke. From 1951 to 1976, he was the choir director of the  "Johann Friedrich Reichardt". From 1968, he taught music theory and music history at the University of Halle-Wittenberg. In 1972, he was awarded the DissertationA Die Solokonzerte von Dmitri Shostakovich. Untersuchungen über Aufbau der Werke und ihre ästhetische Wertung led to his Dr. phil. doctorate. In 1982, followed the dissertationB Die kompositorischen Gestaltungsmittel unseres Jahrhunderts als Gegenstand der Musiktheorie. Zech published several contributions to music theory and emerged as a composer.

Zech died in Halle (Saale) at the age of 78.

Compositions

Instrumental music 
 Kleine Suite für Kammerorchester, 1957
 2 Sonatinen für Klavier, 1958
 Holzbläser-Quartett, 1959
 Kleine Suite, 1959
 Vier kleine Stücke für Klavier, 1960
 Festliche Musik für Kammerorchester, 1961
 Preludio, 1963
 Leuna II, 1963
 Nonett für Bläser und Schlagwerk, 1966
 Kleine Sinfonie für Jugendorchester, 1968
 Divertimento für Streichorchester, 1970
 Concertante Musik für Kammerorchester, 1971
 Streichquartett, 1977

Vocal music 
 Kantate vom neuen Menschen, 1960
 Festkantate, 1961
 Unser Jahr beginnt im Mai, 1965
 Memlebener Kantate, 1976

Publications 
 with Kurt Johnen: Allgemeine Musiklehre. 15th completely reworked edition, Reclam, Leipzig 1984.
 Tonsatzstudien. Funktionsharmonik, Liedbegleitung, Kontrapunkt. Deutscher Verlag für Musik, Leipzig 1988.
 Die kompositorischen Gestaltungsmittel unseres Jahrhunderts als Gegenstand der Musiktheorie.

References

Further reading 
 Günter Bust, Kerstin Hansen: Irrgang, Horst Artur Alfred. In Guido Heinrich, Gunter Schandera (ed.): Magdeburger Biographisches Lexikon 19. und 20. Jahrhundert. Biographisches Lexikon für die Landeshauptstadt Magdeburg und die Landkreise Bördekreis, Jerichower Land, Ohrekreis und Schönebeck. Scriptum, Magdeburg 2002,

External links 
 
 

German choral conductors
20th-century German composers
20th-century classical composers
Academic staff of the Martin Luther University of Halle-Wittenberg
1928 births
1999 deaths
People from Potsdam
20th-century German musicologists